Amos Noyes Currier (October 3, 1832 – May 16, 1909) was the acting President of the University of Iowa from 1898 to 1899.

Presidents of the University of Iowa
1832 births
1909 deaths
19th-century American educators